CaseStack is an American company that provides supply chain management (SCM) services, including warehousing, transportation, and supply chain management software (SCMS) to consumer packaged goods companies (CPGs). It uses a proprietary software as a service platform for its collaborative retailer consolidation programs. CaseStack has been recognized in Food Logistics' Top 85 3PL Providers, Global Logistics & Supply Chain Strategies 100 Great Supply Chain Partners and Inbound Logistics' Top 100 3PL Providers.

History
CaseStack was founded in 1999 by former Procter & Gamble executive, Dan Sanker. CaseStack began with a headquarters based in Santa Monica, California, and added another in Fayetteville, Arkansas in 2007.

CaseStack offers three distinct technology editions for logistics services: a Transportation Edition for clients who outsource only transportation services; a Logistics Edition that includes warehousing; and an Enterprise Edition for clients who integrate with their enterprise-wide systems.

In April 2018, CaseStack announced a strategic partnership with ShipChain, a blockchain based solution provider for the transport and logistics industry.

In November 2018, CaseStack announced it was being acquired as a division of Hub Group,  a transportation management company.

In December 2018, Hub Group completed the acquisition of CaseStack.

References 

Logistics companies of the United States